Charles Hunt Brown (October 10, 1886 – May 16, 1963) was an American college football player and coach and judge. He was a standout guard for coach Dan McGugin's Vanderbilt Commodores football teams at Vanderbilt University, playing next to his brother Tom Brown. Charles Brown also served as the head football coach at Birmingham College in 1916 and at Birmingham–Southern College from 1919 to 1923. Brown played for Vanderbilt teams that won back to back Southern Intercollegiate Athletic Association (SIAA) championships in 1910 and 1911. Brown played for the 1917 Camp Gordon football team coached by Jogger Elcock.

Brown served as an infantry captain in the United States Army during World War I, losing a leg in combat in the Meuse–Argonne offensive in France. He was an assistant city attorney, deputy solicitor, and assistant state attorney before being appointed as a judge in Birmingham, Alabama in 1958. He was reappointed to the bench in 1962. Brown died on May 16, 1963, in Birmingham, after collapsing while presiding in court.

Brown urged his son, Charles Jr., to attend Georgia Tech.

Head coaching record

References

External links
 

1963 deaths
1886 births
American football guards
Birmingham–Southern Panthers football coaches
Camp Gordon football players
Vanderbilt Commodores football players
United States Army officers
United States Army personnel of World War I
People from Sumner County, Tennessee
Lawyers from Birmingham, Alabama
Sportspeople from Birmingham, Alabama
Players of American football from Birmingham, Alabama